Raphitoma bourguignati is a species of sea snail, a marine gastropod mollusc in the family Raphitomidae.

Description
The length of the shell reaches a length of 22 mm and a diameter of 8 mm.

This species was previously included in the speciescomplex Raphitoma purpurea. Compared with R. purpurea, the shell is narrower and the spire is more slender. The whorls are less convex. The axial ribs are very close, larger and more regular. They form with the spiral threads a regular reticulation with nodules. The ground color of the shell is a bright pale yellow.

Distribution
This marine species occurs in the Atlantic Ocean off France

References

 Pusateri F., Giannuzzi Savelli R., Bartolini S. & Oliverio M. (2017). A revision of the Mediterranean Raphitomidae (Neogastropoda, Conoidea) 4: The species of the group of Raphitoma purpurea (Montagu, 1803) with the description of a new species. Bollettino Malacologico. 53(2): 161-183.

External links
 

bourguignati
Gastropods described in 1891